The 1958–59 Washington State Cougars men's basketball team represented Washington State College for the 1958–59 NCAA college basketball season. Led by first-year head coach Marv Harshman, the Cougars were members of the Pacific Coast Conference and played their home games on campus at Bohler Gymnasium in Pullman, Washington.

Harshman was formerly the head coach at his alma mater, Pacific Lutheran, for thirteen seasons, and he led the Cougars for thirteen years.

The PCC disbanded in the spring and Washington State was an independent for three years, then joined the AAWU, today's Pac-12 Conference.

The school became "Washington State University" in September 1959.

References

External links
Sports Reference – Washington State Cougars: 1958–59 basketball season

Washington State Cougars men's basketball seasons
Washington Huskies
Washington
Washington